= Sharifpura =

- Neighborhood of Amritsar
- Interactive map of Sharifpura
- Country: India
- State: Punjab
- City: Amritsar

Languages
  - Official: Punjabi
- Time zone: UTC+5:30 (IST)

Sharifpura is a locality in Amritsar, in the Punjab state of India. It was established by Deputy Mohammad Shariff, a prominent Muslim figure known as the "Raees of Amritsar", and his son Engineer Fazal ur Rehman Shariff in the early 1920s. Engineer Fazal ur Rehman Shariff earned a degree in civil engineering from Liverpool, England in 1912 and returned to Amritsar. He later joined the irrigation department in Punjab as an SDO and worked on various projects including work on the Sulemanki Headworks. He was one of the first qualified Muslim engineers in Punjab.

Sharifpura was to envisioned as a township for local Muslim. This locality became the refuge and final safe haven for the Muslims who migrated to Pakistan in 1947. Sharifpura was attacked two months after partition, driving out any remaining survivors.
